The 2019 Women's EuroHockey Championship II was the eighth edition of the Women's EuroHockey Championship II, the second level of the European field hockey championships organized by the EHF.

It was held from the 4th until the 10th of August 2019 at the Glasgow National Hockey Centre in Glasgow, Scotland. The tournament also served as a direct qualifier for the 2021 Women's EuroHockey Nations Championship, with the winner, Scotland, and runner-up, Italy, qualifying.

Qualified teams
The following eight teams, shown with pre-tournament world rankings, competed in the tournament.

Format
The eight teams were split into two groups of four teams. The top two teams advanced to the semi-finals to determine the winner in a knockout system. The bottom two teams played in a new group with the teams they did not play against in the group stage. The last two teams are relegated to the EuroHockey Championship III.

Results
All times are local, BST (UTC+1).

Preliminary round

Pool A

Pool B

Fifth to eighth place classification

Pool C
The points obtained in the preliminary round against the other team are taken over.

First to fourth place classification

Semi-finals

Third and fourth place

Final

Statistics

Final standings

 Qualified for the 2021 EuroHockey Championship

 Relegated to the EuroHockey Championship III

Goalscorers

See also
 2019 Men's EuroHockey Championship II
 2019 Women's EuroHockey Championship III
 2019 Women's EuroHockey Nations Championship

References

Women's EuroHockey Championship II
EuroHockey Championship II Women
International women's field hockey competitions hosted by Scotland
International sports competitions in Glasgow
2010s in Glasgow
EuroHockey Championship II Women
Glasgow Green
Women 2